The Mainstream Top 40 chart ranks the top-performing singles on contemporary hit radio, compiled by Nielsen SoundScan based collectively on each single's weekly airplay, and published in Billboard magazine. The following are the songs which reached number one on the chart during the year 2008 in chronological order.

During 2008, a total of 14 singles hit number-one on the charts.

Chart history

References

See also
2008 in music

Billboard charts
Mainstream Top 40 2008
United States Mainstream Top 40
2008 in American music